The Bangladesh Army is the land warfare branch and the largest component of the Bangladesh Armed Forces. The primary mission of the Army is to provide necessary forces and capabilities to deliver the Bangladeshi government's security and defence strategies and defending the nation's territorial integrity against external attack. Control of personnel and operations is administered by the Army Headquarters, Dhaka. The Bangladesh Army is also constitutionally obligated to assist the government and its civilian agencies during times of domestic national emergency. This additional role is commonly referred to as "aid to civil administration".

History

Early history 
The martial tradition of Bengal has its roots in the army of Kings and their chiefs who were called Senapati or Mahasenapati. Armies were composed of infantry, cavalry, war elephants and war boats. The arrival of Muslims and the establishment of the Bengal Sultanate further strengthened the military. The sultanate had well organised disciplined armies. During Mughal rule cannons and artillery were introduced to Bengal. During the Colonial Rule of the British, Bengal was principally a bulwark of British power and trade in the South Asian region. The British under Robert Clive defeated a 50,000 strong Bengal Army of Nawab Siraj-ud-daullah in the Palashi (Plassey) in 1757 and later the forces of Nawab Mir Qasim at the Battle of Buxar in 1764. The Army of Bengal was formed, which later became part of a united British Indian Army from 1895 to 1947. The eastern part of the British India was a prominent place for military and police recruitment, with entire horse-mounted cavalry and lancer units being recruited there prior to the Bengal Sepoy Mutiny of 1857. Post-mutiny, units with the epithet "Bengal" in their name, such as Bengal Sappers and Bengal Cavalry, were largely recruited from non-Bengali peoples from Bihar, Varanasi and Uttar Pradesh which were technically still part of Bengal Presidency at that time. During the First World War, the Bangali Paltan was formed to recruit soldiers from Bengal. In 1916, the British Government created Bengali Double Company. The soldiers were trained in Karachi and shipped to the Bagdad. They fought in the war and after the war helped crush a rebellion by Kurds in 1919.

During the Second World War, British Indian Army Eastern Command created an auxiliary force who were part engineers and part infantry named as Indian Army Pioneer Corps. Most of the soldiers were recruited from both West and East Bengal. This force assisted the main war effort by building roads, airfields, fortifications and, when needed, fought the Japanese in an infantry role. This force was organised in company groups attached to various regiments of Indian Army in direct support role. Captain Abdul Gani was a company commander in the Burma front and led his troops in battle. After the war these Pioneer Troops were concentrated in Jalna, India, waiting to be demobilised and return home. In 1946 Captain Ghani the then Adjutant and Quartermaster of Indian Pioneer Corps Centre at Jalna envisioned and generated the idea of forming an Infantry regiment out of the Pioneer soldiers from East Bengal who would be returning home demobilised, to the Centre Commander. After receiving permission from the Chief of Staff of Pakistan Army General Sir Frank Messervy, he organised his men to form the nucleus of an Infantry Regiment, the Bangali Paltan (Platoon).

Pakistan period
At the time of the creation of Pakistan Abdul Gani got the approval of the then newly appointed Commander-in-Chief of the Pakistan Army General Frank Messervy to form the East Bengal Regiment composed solely of youths from East Bengal, would be East Pakistan. On 17 August 1947 General Messervey while bidding farewell to the Pioneer Corps soldiers from Bombay the General endorsed the views of Captain Ghani and said' you will prove to the world that Bengali soldiers are equally competent as other nations of the world.' With these inspiring words Captain Ghani moved to Dhaka in September 1947 with two Pioneer Companies and was temporarily located in Pilkhana now the Headquarters of Border Guards Bangladesh. He was later told by the administration to find a suitable place to accommodate the soldiers. He moved to the north of the Capital and found Kurmitola as the perfect place for a cantonment. Toiling day in and day out the barracks were constructed and jungles cleared, parade ground prepared.

On 15 February 1948 the flag of First East Bengal Regiment the pioneer of Bangladesh Army was raised with Captain Ghani on the lead of all the affairs though the first commanding officer was British Lt Col V J E Patterson.  after the raising of the first battalion the second battalion was approved Captain Gani began to recruit the personnel for the regiment. On 7 February 1949, the flag of the Second East Bengal was raised with the newly recruited soldiers and from personnel from First East Bengal. Before the Bangladesh Liberation War in 1971, a total of 8 battalions of the East Bengal Regiment were formed.

Liberation war 1971

In 1970 Sheikh Mujibur Rahman lead Bangladesh Awami League to win the General Elections of Pakistan. The Pakistan Army which was then in power refused to handover power and unrest broke out. On 25 March 1971 Pakistan Armed Forces cracked down on the civilian population of East Pakistan through the start of Operation Searchlight and Sheikh Mujibur Rahman declared the independence of Bangladesh. The Pakistan Army and allied paramilitaries killed hundreds of thousands of civilians and uniformed personnel. As a result, in March 1971, Bengali soldiers in East Pakistan revolted and the Bangladesh Liberation War started. There was a Bangladesh Army Sector Commanders Conference during 11–17 July 1971. The conference was held three months after the oath of the newly formed Bangladesh Government at Meherpur, Kushtia. During this conference, the structure and formation as well as resolving issues surrounding the organisation of the various sectors, strategy and reinforcements of the Bangladeshi forces was determined. It was of considerable historical importance from a tactical point of view, as it determined the command structure of the Bangladeshi forces throughout Bangladesh Liberation War.

This conference was presided over by the Bangladesh interim government in exile, headed by then Prime Minister Tajuddin Ahmed and Colonel (Retd.) M. A. G. Osmani was made the chairman of the Joint Chiefs of Staff of the Bangladesh Armed Forces. M. A. G. Osmani was reinstated into active duty from his retirement. Principal participants of this conference included: Squadron Leader M. Hamidullah Khan, Major Ziaur Rahman, Major Abdul Jalil, Captain ATM Haider, Lt. Col. MA Rab and Major Khaled Mosharraf.
As a result of this meeting, Bangladesh was divided into eleven sectors. These sectors were placed under the control of Sector Commanders, who would direct the guerilla war against Pakistani occupation forces. For better efficiency in military operations each of the sectors were also divided into a number of sub-sectors. As a point of note, the 10th Sector was under direct command of the Commander-in-Chief and included the Naval Commando Unit as a C-in-C's special force.

Following the conference a period of prolonged guerrilla warfare was launched by Bangladesh Forces, which continued for a number of months. A further restructuring was undertaken and the Bangladesh Forces were organised into three brigade size combat groups:
 K Force, under Major Khaled Mosharraf, was created with 4th, 9th and 10th East Bengal Regiment.
 S Force, under Major K M Shafiullah, was created with 2nd and 11th East Bengal Regiment.
 Z Force, under Major Ziaur Rahman, was created with 1st, 3rd and 8th East Bengal Regiment.

Post 1971: The emergence of the Bangladesh Army 
During the sensitive and formative years after the end of the war, personnel of the Mukti Bahini were absorbed into different branches of Bangladesh Army. In 1974 Bangladeshi soldiers and officers repatriated from Pakistan after the Bangladesh Liberation war were absorbed into Bangladesh Army.

During the 1972-73 tenure, engineers, signals, army services, ordnance, military police, remount veterinary and farm and medical corps was established in Bangladesh Army. Bangladesh military academy was established in Cumilla cantonment in 1974. On 11 January 1975, the passing out parade of the first Bangladesh Army short course took place. In 1975 the President Guard Regiment (PGR) was established.

There were suspicion among the army personnel of the formation of the paramilitary Jatiya Rakkhi Bahini and the addition of civilian Mukti Bahini members in it. These suspicions and misconceptions laid the foundation and formed the bedrock of disputes between professional army officers and the ruling administration which led to a very bloody chapter in the history of newly independent Bangladesh.

Coups, uprisings and assassinations 

On 15 August 1975 a few sacked army officers, disgruntled junior officers and NCOs secretly planned and assassinated President Sheikh Mujibur Rahman and his entire family at his personal residence in Dhanmondi, Dhaka, except for his two daughters (Sheikh Hasina and Sheikh Rehana) who were abroad. Five of those responsible officers were executed in January 2010 while others are still absconding and are outside Bangladesh. After the assassination of Sheikh Mujibur Rahman a new government, led by Khandkar Mushtaq Ahmed and supported by the coup plotters, was set in place. Khandakar Mushtaq passed the Indemnity ordinance which provided immunity to the assassins of Sheikh Muibur Rahman.

Three months later on 3 November 1975, several senior officers and NCO's led by Maj. Gen. Khaled Mosharraf and Colonel Shafaat Jamil led their own forces to remove Khandakar Mushtaq's government from power who they believed was an unlawful government in the first place. That same day the same group of disgruntled army personnel who assassinated Sheikh Mujib and had jailed politicians involved with the Bangladesh Liberation war, assassinated Syed Nazrul Islam, Tajuddin Ahmed, Muhammad Mansur Ali and AHM Qamaruzzaman in Dhaka Central Jail. Chief of Army Staff, Major General Ziaur Rahman was placed under house arrest.

On 7 November 1975, a short but highly organised uprising concentrated only in Dhaka, formed by members of the Jatiyo Samajtantrik Dal (National Socialist Party) and members of enlisted personnel led by Lt. Col. (Retd.) Abu Taher also resulted in the killing of several army and air force officers and soldiers including Major General Khaled Mosharraf, Major ATM Haider. Colonel Shafaat Jamil was arrested and forcibly retired. Colonel Abu Taher released Major General Ziaur Rahman who was imprisoned by Khaled Mosharraf. Ziaur Rahman took promotion to Lieutenant General and appointed himself as the Chief of Army Staff and Deputy Chief Martial Law Administrator. He then executed Lt. Col. Taher for his role in the coup on 7 November. Later, in 1977 under a public referendum of a yes no vote he took the helm as president. On 30 May 1981 President Ziaur Rahman was assassinated in the Chattogram Circuit House in a military coup.

Less than a year later, the then Chief of Army Staff Lt. Gen. Hussein Muhammad Ershad on 24 March 1982 took power in a silent coup at dawn, suspended the constitution and imposed martial law and remained in power through farce elections and corruption. He remained in power until 6 December 1990.

Chattogram Hill Tracts Conflict 

The Chattogram Hill Tracts Conflict was the political and military conflict between the Government of Bangladesh and the Parbatya Chattagram Jana Sanghati Samiti (United People's Party of the Chattogram Hill Tracts) and its armed wing, the Shanti Bahini over the issue of autonomy and the rights of the tribes of the Chattogram Hill Tracts. The Shanti Bahini launched an insurgency against government forces in 1977, and the conflict continued for twenty years until the Bangladesh government and the PCJSS signed the Chattogram Hill Tracts Peace Accord in 1997.

At the outbreak of the insurgency, the Government of Bangladesh deployed the army to begin counter-insurgency operations. The then-President of Bangladesh Major General Ziaur Rahman created a Chittagong Hill Tracts Development Board under an army general to address the socio-economic needs of the region, but the entity proved unpopular and became a source of antagonism and mistrust among the local tribes against the government. The government failed to address the long-standing issue of the displacement of tribal people, numbering an estimated 100,000 caused by the construction of the Kaptai Dam by the then Pakistan government in 1962. Displaced tribesmen did not receive compensation and more than 40,000 Chakma tribals had fled to India. In the 1980s, the government began settling Bengalis in the region, causing the eviction of many tribesmen and a significant alteration of demographics. Having constituted only 11.6% of the regional population in 1974, the number of Bangalis grew by 1991 to constitute 48.5% of the regional population.

Peace negotiations were initiated after the restoration of democracy in Bangladesh in 1991, but little progress was made with the government of Prime Minister Begum Khaleda Zia and her Bangladesh Nationalist Party. Fresh rounds of talks began in 1996 with the newly elected prime minister Sheikh Hasina Wajed of the Awami League. The Chattogram Hill Tracts Peace Accord was finalised and formally signed on 2 December 1997.

Subsequent growth 

Following the 1975 coup, additional personnel were absorbed into the regular army when the martial law government abolished the Jatiyo Rakkhi Bahini. Under Zia's rule, Bangladesh was divided into five military regions. When Ershad assumed power in 1982, army strength had stabilised at about 70,000 troops. Starting in 1985, the army had experienced another spurt in growth. As of mid-1988, it had about 90,000 troops (although some observers believed the number was closer to 80,000), triple the 1975 figure.

Bangladesh Armed Forces participated in the Gulf war in 1991 Operation Desert Storm alongside other multinational forces under Allied Command. The Bangladesh Army brought in a contingent of Engineers and undertook the task of clearing mines and bombs in Kuwait. This assistance took place under the operational code name "Operation Kuwait Punargathan (OKP)" in English "Operation Rebuilding Kuwait (ORK)".

The Bangladesh Army structure is similar to the armies of the Commonwealth Nations. However, major changes have taken place following the adoption of US Army tactical planning procedures, training management techniques and noncommissioned officer educational systems.

Forces goal 2030

Bangladesh armed forces are going through a long term modernization plan named Forces Goal 2030. Bangladesh army is under a massive expansion and modernization drive as per the plan. The force is being divided into three corps — Central, Eastern and Western. Three new infantry divisions have been raised, the 17th infantry division at Sylhet, 10th infantry division at Ramu in Cox's Bazar and 7th infantry division at Barishal-Patuakhali to make the number of total infantry divisions ten. The soldiers are being equipped with modern gear like Night Vision Goggles (NVG), Ballistic helmets, Eye protective gear, Bulletproof vest, person to person communicators, palmtop GPS device and BD-08 assault rifles with Collimator sight.

To increase special operation capabilities, 2nd Commando Battalion has been raised. The two battalions formed sole the para-commando brigade of the country. Bangladesh Army procured 44 MBT-2000 tanks from China in 2011. Bangladesh army engineers have completed the upgrade of Type 69 tanks to Type 69IIG standard. They are now upgrading 174 Type 59 tanks to Type 59G Durjoy standard. To increase the mobility of the infantry forces, 300 armoured vehicles such as BTR-80 APC, Otokar Cobra LAV and BOV M11 ARV have been procured.

To modernize the artillery forces, Nora B-52 K2 self-propelled artillery system have been procured from Serbia. Their firepower is further increased by the addition of two regiment of WS-22 Guided Multiple Rocket Launcher System. For anti-tank role Metis-M missile systems and PF-98 rocket systems were procured. Two regiments of FM 90 surface to air missile were added in 2016 to enhance air defence capabilities. The army aviation wing is also being modernized. Two Eurocopter AS365 Dauphins were put into service in 2012.  Six Mil Mi-171Sh were procured in 2016. One C-295W transport aircraft was ordered from Spain which was delivered in 2017. Bangladesh Army also procured 36 Bramor C4EYE battlefield reconnaissance UAV from Slovenia in 2017.

Contribution to UN Peacekeeping Operations 

The Bangladesh Army has been actively involved in a number of United Nations Peace Support Operations (UNPSO) since its formation in the 1970s. Its first deployments came in 1988, when it participated in two operations – UNIIMOG in Iraq and UNTAG in Namibia President HM Ershad initiated these deployments for the first time, starting with the contribution to UNIIMOG in Iraq.

Later, as part of the UNIKOM force deployed to Kuwait and Saudi Arabia following the Gulf War the Bangladesh Army sent a mechanised infantry battalion (approx. 2,193 personnel). Since then, the Bangladesh Army has been involved in up to thirty different UNPKOs in as many as twenty five countries. This has included activities in Angola, Namibia, Cambodia, Somalia, Sudan, Eritrea, Uganda, Rwanda, Bosnia & Herzegovina, Mozambique, former Yugoslavia, Liberia, Haiti, Tajikistan, Western Sahara, Sierra Leone, Kosovo, Georgia, East Timor, Congo, Côte d'Ivoire and Ethiopia.

As a result of its contributions to various UN peacekeeping operations, up to 88 Bangladesh soldiers have lost their lives (as of February 2009). However, the performance of Bangladesh's contingents has been described as being of the "highest order" and the appointment of several senior Bangladesh military officers as the commander of UN peacekeeping missions and Senior Military Liaison Officers, may be seen as further recognition of the Bangladesh Army's growing esteem in the peacekeeping community. In January 2004, BBC described the Bangladeshi UN Force as "Cream of UN Peacekeepers".

Bangladesh Army has specialised its peacekeeping operation capabilities around the world through participation in numerous peacekeeping and nation building operations. It has created BIPSOT (Bangladesh Institute of Peace Support Operation Training) which specialises in the training of peacekeepers for employment in all types of UNPSO (UN Peace Support Operations). This institute fulfills the requirement of UNDPKO as per U.N. General Assembly resolution which outlines 'the necessity and responsibility of every nation to train their armed forces before any deployment.

Women in Bangladesh Army

Bangladeshi women can join the army as ordinary soldiers since 2013; however in the officer ranks women can join since the early part of the 2000s decade while women are joining in the medical corps since the army's inception and in the Bangladesh liberation war. Captain Sitara Begum of army medical corps was a noted woman. On 1 October 2018 Bangladesh army got its first female major-general and the person was Susane Giti (commissioned in 1980s) and she was from the medical corps. Female soldiers can also get United Nations peacekeeping duties like male soldiers. On 25 January 2019, Bangladesh Army appointed four lady battalion commanders for the first time.

List of Chiefs of Army Staff

Organisation

Structure 

Army Headquarters 

The Army Headquarters consists of Chief of Army Staff & his seven Principal Staff Officers & several Directors & Staff Officers who support, advice & assist the Chief of Army Staff for the smooth functioning of the Army. The Branches & Directorates of Army Headquarters are given below-

Chief of Army Staff's Secretariat

General Staff Branch

Quarter Master General's Branch

Adjudant General's Branch

Master General of Ordnance Branch

Engineer in Chief's Branch

Military Secretary's Branch

Judge Advocate General's Branch

Administrative branches 
Bangladesh Army is divided into the following administrative Corps:

Rank structure

Commissioned Officers 
Commissioned officers are honored as 'first class gazetted officers' by the Bangladesh government.

Non-Commissioned Officers (NCOs) and Ordinary Soldiers 
NCO rank starts from Lance Corporal. Sergeants holds key appointments in companies, batteries (company equivalent of artillery), infantry battalions and artillery regiments, e.g. Company Quartermaster Sergeant (CQMS), Regimental Sergeant Major (RSM), persons holding these appointments have separate rank insignias though these are not actually ranks.

List of cantonments 
Cantonments are where Bangladesh Army personnel work, train, and live.

 Alikadam Cantonment, Bandarban
 Bandarban Cantonment
 Chattogram Cantonment
 Cumilla Cantonment, Cumilla
 Dhaka Cantonment
 Dighinala Cantonment, Khagrachhari
 Halishahar Cantonment, Chattogram
 Jahanabad Cantonment, Khulna
 Jahangirabad Cantonment, Bogura
 Jalalabad Cantonment, Sylhet
 Jamuna Cantonment, Tangail
 Jashore Cantonment
 Kaptai Cantonment, Rangamati
 Khagrachari Cantonment
 Kholahati Cantonment, Dinajpur
 Majhira Cantonment, Bogura
 Mirpur Cantonment
 Mymensingh Cantonment
 Padma Cantonment, Madaripur
 Postogola Cantonment
 Qadirabad Cantonment, Natore
 Rajendrapur Cantonment, Gazipur
 Rajshahi Cantonment
 Ramu Cantonment, Cox's Bazar
 Rangamati Cantonment
 Rangpur Cantonment
 Lalmonirhat Cantonment
 Saidpur Cantonment, Nilphamari
 Savar Cantonment
 Shahid Salahuddin Cantonment, Ghatail
 Sheikh Hasina Cantonment, Lebukhali Patuakhali
 Sylhet Cantonment, Sylhet.
 Freedom Fighter Abdul Hamid Cantonment, Kishoreganj

Educational and training institutes

Medical

 Armed Forces Institute of Pathology
Armed Forces Medical College (AFMC), Dhaka Cantonment, Dhaka
Army Medical College, Bogra (AMCB), Majhira Cantonment, Bogura
Army Medical College, Chattogram (AMCC), Chattogram Cantonment, Chattogram
Army Medical College, Comilla (AMCCu), Cumilla Cantonment, Cumilla
Army Medical College, Jessore (AMCJ), Jassore Cantonment, Jashore
Army Medical College, Rangpur (RAMC), Rangpur Cantonment, Rangpur

University

Bangladesh Army International University of Science & Technology (BAIUST), Mainamati Cantonment, Cumilla
Bangladesh Army University of Science & Technology, Khulna (BAUSTK), Jahanabad Cantonment, Khulna
Bangladesh Army University of Engineering & Technology (BAUET) Qadirabad Cantonment, Natore
Bangladesh Army University of Science And Technology (BAUST), Saidpur Cantonment, Nilphamari
Bangladesh University of Professionals (BUP), Mirpur Cantonment, Dhaka
Army Institute of Business Administration (AIBA), Jalalabad Cantonment, Sylhet
Army Institute of Business Administration (Army IBA), Savar Cantonment, Dhaka
Military Institute of Science and Technology (MIST), Mirpur Cantonment, Dhaka

Others

Armoured Corps Centre & School (ACC&S), Majira Cantonment, Bogura
Army Medical Corps Centre & School (AMCC&S), Shaheed Salahuddin Cantonment, Ghatail, Tangail
Army School of Music (ASM), Chattogram Cantonment, Chattogram
Army School of Physical Training and Sports (ASPTS), Dhaka Cantonment, Dhaka
Bangladesh Army Football Team (BAFT), Dhaka Cantonment, Dhaka
Army Service Corps Centre & School (ASCC&S), Jahanabad Cantonment, Khulna
Artillery Centre and School (AC&S), Halishahar, Chattogram
Bangladesh Infantry Regimental Centre (BIRC), Rajshahi Cantonment, Rajshahi
Bangladesh Institute of Peace Support Operation Training (BIPSOT), Rajendrapur Cantonment, Gazipur
Bangladesh Military Academy (BMA), Bhatiary, Chattogram
Bangladesh National Cadet Corps (BNCC)
Centre and School of Military Police, Education and Administration (CSMEA), Shahid Salahuddin Cantonment, Ghatail, Tangail
Defence Services Command and Staff College (DSCS&C), Mirpur Cantonment, Dhaka
East Bengal Regimental Centre (EBRC), Chattogram Cantonment, Chattogram
Electrical and Mechanical Engineering Centre and School (EMEC&S), Saidpur Cantonment, Nilphamari
Engineer Centre and School of Military Engineering (ECSME), Quadirabad Cantonment, Natore
National Defence College (NDC), Mirpur Cantonment, Dhaka
Non-Commissioned Officers Academy (NCOA), Majira Cantonment, Bogura
Ordnance Centre & School (OC&S), Rajendrapur Cantonment, Gazipur
School of Infantry and Tactics (SI&T), Jalalabad Cantonment, Sylhet
School of Military Intelligence (SMI), Cumilla Cantonment, Cumilla
Signal Training Centre and School (STC&S), Jashore Cantonment, Jashore

Equipment

Future modernisation plan

Bangladesh has made a long term modernisation plan for its Armed Forces named Forces Goal 2030. As per the plan, Bangladesh Army will be divided into three corps — Central, Eastern and Western. A riverine brigade is being formed at Mithamain of Kishoreganj district. Government has a plan to add 97 new units within 2021. Of them, 19 units will be formed for the Sylhet Cantonment, 22 for the Ramu Cantonment and 56 units for the Sheikh Hasina Cantonment in Lebukhali. A Riverine Engineer Battalion is also going to be formed under a proposed cantonment at Mithamoine in Kishorganj. Formation of two new tank regiments is under consideration. Process of converting some regular infantry battalions into para infantry battalions and mechanized infantry battalions is also going on.

Bangladesh Army has started an ambitious modernisation program for its infantry soldiers named Infantry Soldier System. This system includes equipping all of its soldiers with modern equipment like Night Vision Goggles (NVG), Ballistic helmets, Eye protective gear, Bulletproof vest, person to person communicators, palmtop GPS device and BD-08 assault rifles with Collimator sight. In April 2018, a RFI was published for procurement of assault rifles and submachine guns. Evaluation notice for medium range Anti-tank guided missile was also published in April 2017. In March 2018, Bangladesh Army issued tender for the procurement of 220 anti-tank weapons. The models shortlisted are Russian RPG-7V2 and Chinese Type 69-1.

Evaluation process of 155mm howitzer also started in September 2017. In November 2017, Bangladesh army started the evaluation process of 122 mm field artillery howitzers. Later on in November 2017, the Bangladesh Army published the tender for the procurement of 105mm towed field artillery systems. In 2019, army signed contract to procure one regiment of T-300 Kasirga Multiple Launch Rocket System (MLRS) system from Turkey.

Bangladesh Army signed contract with China for 44 VT-5 light tanks. The tanks were scheduled to be delivered within 2020.

In March 2018, tender was floated for two local warning radars. The models shortlisted for the tender are Ground Master 400 of Thales, TRML-3D/32 of Hensoldt and KRONOS Land of Leonardo. Army also issued tender for procuring 181 Man-portable air-defense systems. Here, Chinese FN-16, Russian Igla-S and Swedish RBS 70 systems has been shortlisted.

Army Aviation has plan to add one more EADS CASA C-295 transport aircraft to its fleet soon. Besides, process is going on to procure six more Mil Mi-171Sh helicopters. They also have a plan to add attack helicopters to the fleet in the near future.

Tender was floated for procurement of a command ship in 2017. The vessel will be used as a floating command centre during different operations. Several tenders were floated to procure a total of six Landing craft tank for the army between 2017 and 2018. Bangladesh army issued tender for procuring two Troops Carrier Vessel (TCV) in January 2018. The vessels will be able to carry 200 personnel.

On 29 June 2021, Government to Government (G2G) defence memorandum of understanding (MoU) signed between Bangladesh and Turkey. According to Dr. İsmail Demir, president of Presidency of Defense Industries, the export agreement of various products of Roketsan has been signed with Bangladesh. Roketsan already delivered TRG-300 Tiger MLRS to the Bangladesh Army in June 2021 from a separate agreement.

In a ceremony on 27 October 2021, Prime Minister discussed about the ongoing modernization plan of the Bangladesh Army and its upcoming equipment. She states that one regiment of 105 mm and 155 mm each artillery guns have been procured to increase the artillery power. She added that process of procuring one battery of Oerlikon GDF-009 was going on. Government had signed a contract to procure Very Short Range Air Defence (VSHORAD)system and two battery of radar controlled air defence guns. Government also procured six MALE UAV and tactical missile system for Bangladesh Army.

See also 

 Medals of the Bangladesh Armed Forces
 Bangladesh Machine Tools Factory
 Bangladesh Ordnance Factories
 List of serving generals of the Bangladesh Army
 Border Guards Bangladesh
 Rapid Action Battalion

References

 Barthorp, Michael. 1979. Indian Infantry Regiments, 1860–1914. Osprey Publishing.

External links 

 
 Library of Congress Country Studies assessment of Bangladesh Army (1988)
 Bangladesh Armed Forces#Training institutes of Bangladesh Air Force

 
Government agencies of Bangladesh
Military units and formations established in 1971
1971 establishments in Bangladesh
Uniformed services of Bangladesh